XHBIO-FM is a radio station on 92.3 FM in Guadalajara. The station is owned by Grupo Promomedios and carries a grupera format known as Fiesta Mexicana.

History
XHBIO received its first concession on June 18, 1973. It was originally designated XHCD-FM and owned by José de Jesús Cortés y Barbosa. The callsign was changed in 1979.

References

Radio stations in Guadalajara
Radio stations established in 1973